Families Need Fathers - Both Parents Matter (FNF), founded in 1974, is a registered charitable social care organization in the United Kingdom that offers information, advice, and support to parents whose children's relationship with them is under threat during or after divorce or separation, or who have been alienated or estranged from their children. FNF also advocates for shared parenting, more time for children with their non-resident parent, and stronger court actions when a resident parent defies court orders requiring them to allow their children a relationship with the other parent. The organization's goal is that children of divorce or separation should not lose the love and care of one of their parents.


Mission
In the United Kingdom, roughly one third of children from separated parents have no contact with their father, and the organization is chiefly concerned with maintaining a child's relationship with both parents during and after family breakdown.

The majority of the work of the charity is in providing relief, assistance, guidance and support to parents and other close family members hoping to stay in touch with their children after divorce or separation. It aims to further the emotional development of children whose parents have separated by encouraging shared parenting arrangements. The organization also seek to study problems associated with children who are deprived of a parent, and to promote an understanding of these problems among family and legal professionals and policy makers.

History and organization
Families Need Fathers was founded in May 1974 by child psychiatrist Alick Elithorn and financial consultant Keith Parkin as an organization to campaign for equal parenting time after divorce, and for increased contact between a child and its non-custodial parent. The organization became a registered charity in 1979, and was able to hire staff in 1992. As the organization grew in the 1990s, previous employees founded and several new organizations with similar missions, such as Parents Forever Scotland, the Association of Shared Parenting, Dads After Divorce, and Fathers4Justice. In 1994, the Cheltenham Group was formed by FNF, Dads After Divorce and Parents Forever Scotland in an attempt to form a coalition of parenting organizations.

In 2008, FNF ran projects under the umbrella of "Both Parents Matter" and this strapline was added to the charity's logo in 2013. By 2010, the organization had 51 branches across the United Kingdom and a network of 300 volunteers. It has since continued to advocate for shared parenting with the media, the House of Commons and the family justice establishment, while continuing its work as a social care organization.

Jon Davies was the chief executive from 2006 to 2010. The current chair is Paul O'Callaghan.

Parental support work
In 2016, Families Need Fathers received around 25,000 calls to its Helpline, around 5,000 visitors to local meetings, and 185,000 unique page views to its website.

Shared parenting advocacy
The organization advocates for shared parenting, whereby the children live substantial amounts of time with both of their divorced or separated parents. They base their advocacy on scientific studies showing that shared parenting is in the best interest of children, citing research by Malin Bergström, Robert Bauserman, Richard Layard, Judith Dunn, Rebekah Levine Coley and Bethany L. Medeiros, among others.

Criticism
In 1994, Labour Party MP Glenda Jackson claimed that Families Need Fathers advised fathers to kidnap their children if they were not allowed access to them, and if that did not work, to murder the mother. In a subsequent letter regarding the organizations draft mission statement, she reiterated the kidnapping assertion and found the mission statement to be an attack on women rather than an argument for keeping children and parents in contact. In neither instance did the MP provide a source for the kidnapping claim. In 2007, journalist Jenni Murray argued that at its foundation, FNF cast itself outside the frame of respectability as they were said to advocate for the abduction of children whose custody was awarded to the mother. More recently in 2017, Legal Action for Women protested at an FNF conference. They cited Jackson's 1994 kidnapping comment in parliament and protested that the organization has consistently attacked women and that they deny the existence of domestic violence.

See also
Shared parenting
Parental alienation
Shared residency in England
Fathers' rights movement in the UK
English family law
Family court

References

External links
Families Need Fathers Homepage
FNFBPM Cymru Homepage

1974 establishments in the United Kingdom
Charities based in London
Charities based in the United Kingdom
Children's rights
Family and parenting issues groups in the United Kingdom
Fathers' rights
Fathers' rights organizations
Organizations established in 1974
Support groups